Mizusawa may refer to:

Mizusawa (surname)
Mizusawa, Iwate, former city in Iwate Prefecture, Japan
Mizusawa Domain, feudal domain in Mutsu Province, Japan
Mizusawa Station, train station in Iwate, Japan
7530 Mizusawa, main-belt asteroid